Woodley United F.C. is a football club based in Woodley, Berkshire, England. The club can trace its history back to 1904 although it is thought that it existed in the 19th century.

History

Woodley United FC Ladies

Woodley United FC was formed in 2011 as a joint venture by the existing Woodley clubs, Woodley Hammers, Woodley Saints, Woodley Town and Woodley Wanderers, to provide a pathway for ladies and girls to play football within the Town.

Each of the existing clubs ran teams at a single age group in isolation of one another.

As a result of this venture teams are being run at Ladies, u18, u16, u15, u14 and u12 level for season 2011 – 12 in addition to female volunteers having come forward to assist in the coaching and running of the club.

From season 2015–16 the club amalgamated with Woodley Town and Woodley Hammers to form the biggest club in Woodley and kept the name Woodley United FC

Woodley Hammers FC

The club was formed in September 1973 by Brian Finch, composed of boys from the 4th Woodley Scout Troop. They were formed at U12 level and played in the Bracknell Boys League, with their first home pitch being at Rivermead School in Woodley. The name Woodley Hammers came as a result of the kit that Brian obtained for the boys to play in – an old West Ham United kit!

The club has grew continuously throughout the years and celebrated its Silver Jubilee in February 1999.

Woodley Hammers Football Club had teams ranging from U7 to U18 and senior men's teams.

Their youth teams played in the Reading & West Berkshire (R&WB), the Berkshire Youth Development League (BYDL) or the East Berks Football Alliance League (EBFA) whilst their men's football was played in the Reading Football League, Reading and District Sunday League and the Bracknell Town and District Sunday League.

The club motto "guadium joci causa" translates as "enjoyment through sport" and emphasised the club's philosophy of not only giving local children the chance to develop their football skills but also to provide the simple enjoyment of taking part in a team sport. Those children were then given the chance to continue to represent the club at older levels and become more and more successful in winning local competitions and leagues. Winning was not always the primary aim for the club, it was more about participating in an enjoyable atmosphere at a friendly club.

The efforts of the club to provide local football are dedicated to all members past and present, but particularly to the memory of Brian Finch and Terry Gillett.

The club forged a close association with The Bulmershe School, Woodley who are a specialist school for sport. Woodley Hammers were best known for their annual small sided tournament which was usually held at The Bulmershe School. The tournament continues to run under Woodley United FC.

Woodley Town FC

Woodley Town FC was formed in 1904 and competed in the Wargrave & District League. The club achieved in the 1909–10 season the ‘double’ of Champions and Cup Winners. Fourteen seasons later in the 1923–24 season they won the Reading Junior Cup. The club were the last team to win the Wargrave and District League in the 1926–27 season, and then joined the Reading & District League.

With the club in the Reading & District League they had to wait 31 years until the 1957–58 season to win any Silverware by winning the Premier Division. They then won it the season afterwards but would have to wait nearly thirty years to win anything again, when they won the premier division again in the 1985–86 season. The club then went into a period of decline, with the 1990–91 season seeing First Team start the season in the Premier Division of Reading Football League while the Reserves where in Division 4 Kennet. However, an exodus of players saw the First Team fold mid season leaving just the Division four team in operation. The club won Division four that season and Division three the following season. However it took the club another five season to gain promotion to Division one kennet when they finished as runners-up in Division two kennet in the 1997–98 campaign. During their time in Division Two the club also changed their name from Woodley to Woodley Town. In their first two seasons in Division one Kennet the club won the Reading Evening Post Junior Cup in 1999 and the Berks & Bucks Junior Cup a year later. A season later in the 2000–01 campaign the club gained promotion to the Reading League premier Division as runners-up. Next Season the club gained promotion to the Senior Division but could only last a season at the top, being relegated at the end of the 2002–03 season. However the club bounced back up the next season and then managed to stay in the Senior Division.

The 2008–09 season saw the club awarded the FA's Chartered Standard Development kite mark. That season also saw the team winning the Reading Football League Double of the Senior Division and BTC Senior Cup, the latter being played at Madejski Stadium. By winning the premier Division the club then gained promotion to the Hellenic League Division One East, finishing in fourth place their best finish to date in their debut season under manager Cyril Fairchild, and the club continues to play in this division.

During October 2011 Woodley Town F.C. announced plans to join forces with Wokingham and Emmbrook F.C. to create a 'super-club' for the region. However the plan was not fully confirmed. Wokingham believed this plan would allow them to upgrade their pitch at Cantley Park, after trying for several years, but Wokingham council have insisted that the park should remain in public use in its entirety and not sold off to private clubs.

Woodley United FC 2015–

In 2016 the club signed a license with Reading University to look after the Bulmershe Pavilion. All of Woodley United's youth and senior teams play at the Pavilion with exception to the first team who play at the Rivermoor Stadium.

Ground

Woodley United FC

The Woodley United FC first team groundshare the Rivermoor Stadium (Previously known as Scours Lane) with Reading City. All other Woodley United senior and youth teams play at the Bulmershe Pavilion.

Woodley Town FC

Woodley Town played their home games at East Park Farm, Park Lane, Charvil RG10 9TR. As of the start of the 2015/16 season, Woodley Town risked expulsion from the Hellenic League as East Park Farm was not up to the required standard fit for Step 6 football. The club moved out early, and from the start of the 2014/15 season took up residence in a groundshare agreement with Reading Town at Scours Lane. This was to allow the club to safeguard its Step 6 status and allow them to progressively upgrade the facilities at East Park Farm.

Club honours

League honours
Reading League Senior Division:
 Winners (1): 2008–09
Reading League Premier Division:
 Runners-up (2): 2001–02, 2003–04
Reading League Division One Kennet:
 Runners-up (1): 2000–01
Reading League Division Two Kennet:
 Runners-up (1): 1997–98
Reading League Division Three Kennet:
 Winners (1): 1992–93
Reading League Division Four Kennet:
 Winners (1): 1991–92
Reading & District League Premier Division:
 Winners (3): 1957–58, 1958–59, 1985–86
 Runners-up (3): 1952–53, 1953–54, 1954–55
Reading & District League Division One:
 Winners (1): 1932–33
Reading & District League Division Two:
 Winners (1): 1950–51
Reading & District League Division Three:
 Winners (1): 1928–29
Wargrave & District League:
 Winners (2): 1909–10, 1926–27

Cup honours
Berkshire Trophy Centre Senior Cup:
 Winners (2): 1999–00, 2008–09
 Runners-up (1): 2005–06
Reading Challenge Senior Cup:
 Runners-up (4): 1961–62, 1963–64, 2001–02, 2008–09
Maidenhead Norfolkians Senior Cup :
 Runners-up (2): 1952–53, 1953–54
Reading Challenge Jubilee Cup:
 Winners (1): 1992–93
Wargrave & District Cup:
 Winners (1): 1909–10
Berks & Bucks Junior Cup:
 Winners (1): 1999–00
Reading Junior Cup:
 Winners (2): 1909–10, 1998–99
Reading Challenge Junior Cup:
 Winners (1): 1998–99
 Runners-up (1): 1950–51

Club records

Highest League Position: 3rd in Hellenic Division One East 2012–13
Highest Attendance: 141 April 2010

References

External links
Official website

Association football clubs established in 1904
Football clubs in Berkshire
Hellenic Football League
1904 establishments in England
Football clubs in England
Combined Counties Football League